No Strings is Sheena Easton's 11th album and a departure from the pop and R&B style of her earlier recordings with jazz-tinged production arrangements by Patrice Rushen.

The disc was recorded live in the studio, as Easton wanted to record the music in a similar fashion to Frank Sinatra's Capitol Records sessions of the 1960s.  The song "The Nearness of You" was featured on the soundtrack of Indecent Proposal. Easton appears in a cameo role singing the song with Herbie Hancock playing the piano during a pivotal moment in the film, and the song was released as a promo single in some European markets.

The album was released August 13, 1993.

In 2007 No Strings was released on iTunes' available for download.  The disc was reissued by Universal Distribution on July 26, 2013.

Track listing
"Someone to Watch Over Me" (George Gershwin, Ira Gershwin) - 3:18
 "Medley:  I'm in the Mood for Love / Moody's Mood for Love" (Jimmy McHugh, Dorothy Fields / Dorothy Fields, Jimmy McHugh, James Moody) - 4:14
"The Nearness of You" (Hoagy Carmichael, Ned Washington) - 3:17
"How Deep Is the Ocean" (Irving Berlin) - 3:40
"If You Go Away" (Ne me quitte pas) (Jacques Brel, Rod McKuen) - 5:52
"Body and Soul" (Edward Heyman, Frank Eyton, Johnny Green, Robert Sour) - 5:51
"Medley:  Little Girl Blue / When Sunny Gets Blue" (Lorenz Hart, Richard Rodgers / Marvin Fisher, Jack Segal) - 6:10
"The One I Love Belongs to Somebody Else" (Gus Kahn, Isham Jones) - 3:25
"The Man That Got Away" (Harold Arlen, Ira Gershwin) - 4:23
"I Will Say Goodbye" (Alan Bergman, Marilyn Bergman, Michel Legrand) - 2:37
"Never Will I Marry" (Frank Loesser) - 3:25

Editorial reviews
...a warm, assured stylist, whose affection for these American classics is infectious... Rating: B
Entertainment Weekly  (08/13/1993)

No Strings—Sheena conquers the cabaret scene; the album works.
Jazz Times, June 1994

Personnel 
 Sheena Easton – lead vocals
 Patrice Rushen – acoustic piano
 Phil Upchurch – guitar (2, 6, 8)
 Paul Jackson, Jr. – guitar (5, 10)
 Reggie Hamilton – bass (1)
 Ken Wild – bass (2-11)
 John Guerin – drums (1)
 Leon "Ndugu" Chancler – drums (2-11)
 Valerie King – flute (2, 5, 6, 8, 10)
 Marni Johnson – French Horn (2, 5, 6, 8, 10)
 Richard Todd – French Horn (2, 6, 8)
 Fred Jackson, Jr. – alto and soprano saxophones (2, 5, 8, 10), tenor saxophone (6)
 Bob Sheppard – alto and tenor saxophones (4, 7), tenor sax solo (11)
 Larry Williams – tenor saxophone (6, 8), clarinet (6, 8)
 Lew McCreary – trombone (2, 6, 8), bass trombone (5, 10)
 Reggie Young – trombone (2, 6, 8)
 Rick Baptist – trumpet (2, 6, 8), flugelhorn (2, 6, 8)
 Raymond Lee Brown – trumpet (2, 4, 6, 7, 8), flugelhorn (2, 5, 6, 8), cornet (4, 7)

Production 
 Producer and Arranged by Patrice Rushen
 Recorded and Mixed by Rick Winquest
 Assistant Engineers – Eric Cowden and Dann Thompson
 Recorded and mixed at Group IV Recording (Los Angeles, CA).
 Mastered by Bernie Grundman at Bernie Grundman Mastering (Hollywood, CA).
 Music Copyist – Booker White
 Art Direction – Vartan
 Design – Margo Chase and John Coulter
 Photography – Alberto Tolot
 Hair – Barron Matalon
 Stylist – Fleur Theimeyer
 Make-up – Francesca Tolot

References

Allmusic.com
Entertainment Weekly by Josef Woodard on Aug 13, 1993 - 12:00am (08/13/1993)
Jazz Times 1994

1993 albums
Sheena Easton albums
MCA Records albums
Traditional pop albums